City Colleges is an Irish provider of professional and academic education, based in Dublin. It runs degree and diploma courses in Accounting (ACCA), Business, Computing, Professional Law and Psychology, in Dublin city centre and Dundrum. The college specialises in professional education, aimed at graduates and people returning to education. It forms part of the City Education Group, which also includes the secondary school Ashfield College in Dundrum in Dublin, and the College of Progressive Education and City Language School in Dublin city centre.

City Colleges courses are delivered from campuses at South Great George's Street in Dublin city centre and Dundrum; certain courses, such as the FE1 course, ACCA courses and a selection of professional diplomas are available online.

The Law Society of Ireland entrance exams (FE1's) preparatory courses are delivered twice per year commencing in June and November annually.  Kings Inns preparation courses are delivered each June.

The college has a number of accredited professional diploma courses in Psychology, Business, Criminology, Security and Policing, Media and the Arts.  These courses are part-time and generally run over 10 weeks for one evening per week.

Undergraduate Courses

School of Business
BA (Hons) in Business Studies

School of Media, Arts and Humanities
BA (Hons) Early Childhood Education & Care

Postgraduate Courses

School of Law

Professional Law Courses
FE1 Exams Preparatory Course
Honorable Society of King's Inns Entrance Examination Preparatory Course
Qualified Lawyer Transfer Test (QLTT) Programme

References

Education in Dublin (city)
Business schools in the Republic of Ireland
Universities and colleges in the Republic of Ireland